Disc2Phone is a freeware developed by Sony for Sony Ericsson phones to convert music from a computer or audio CD to MP3 format and send them to a Sony Ericsson mobile phone or to a Memory Stick card.

History
This program first came with the PC suite of the first Walkman phone W800i in 2005

System requirements
Microsoft Windows XP SP2 or higher or Vista
900MHz processor
At least 128 MB RAM
Memory Stick
Internet connection
NET Framework 2.0 and .NET framework 1.1 SP1
Windows Media Player 9 or higher

See also
Sony Ericsson
Sony

References

External links
Sony Ericsson
Disc2Phone Release Notes

Windows-only software